Tom Burns (born 23 April 2000) is a taekwondo athlete from New Zealand.

Education 
In 2018, as an 18-year-old, Burns left his home town of Christchurch to study at Korea Nazarene University in Cheonan.

Career 
He was selected to compete at the Taekwondo at the 2020 Summer Olympics – Men's 68 kg and lost to Bradly Sinden. In the repechage he was drawn against Hakan Reçber.

References

External links
 

2000 births
Living people
Taekwondo practitioners at the 2020 Summer Olympics
New Zealand male taekwondo practitioners
Olympic taekwondo practitioners of New Zealand
Sportspeople from Christchurch
21st-century New Zealand people